Tundla Railway Colony is a census town in Firozabad district, in the Indian state of Uttar Pradesh.

Demographics
 India census, Tundla Railway Colony had a population of 11,983. Males constitute 54% of the population, and females 46%. Tundla Railway Colony has an average literacy rate of 78%, which is higher than the national average of 59.5% (male literacy is 86%, and female literacy is 69%). In Tundla Railway Colony, 10% of the population is under 6 years of age.

Overview
Tundla Railway Colony has three big play grounds: Company Bagh Ground, Manoranjan Kendra Ground, and R.P.F. Barrack Ground. The main play ground is Company Bagh Ground.

References

Cities and towns in Firozabad district
Railway Colonies in India

roopendra[dolly babu]nagla ramkishan lainpar tundla 9358033817
 .